Velence is a town in the county of Fejér, Hungary, on the shore of Lake Velence.

Its name is the same in Hungarian as that of the Italian city of Venice, though they are suffixed differently: "in Velence" is Velencén, while Velencében refers to the Italian city (Magyar Angol Nagyszótár, Akadémiai Kiadó. See Hungarian grammar for details).

Notable people
Alajos Hauszmann (1847–1926), architect, professor, member of the Hungarian Academy of Sciences
Klára Somogyi (1913–1996), tennis player
Péter Kun (1967–1993), hard rock guitarist
Zsolt Szekeres (born 1975), football player
Anita Kulcsár (1976–2005), handball player

External links

  in Hungarian

References

Populated places in Fejér County